Power mike (or Mike, or mic) may refer to:

 An amplified and/or higher-wattage microphone
 Michael Okpala (1939–2004), Nigerian professional wrestler and wrestling promoter